Cherwellia is an extinct genus of mammaliaforms, possibly belonging to Morganucodonta, that lived in what is now England during the Middle Jurassic. The type and only known species is Cherwellia leei. It was first described in 2016 by Percy M. Butler and Denise Sigogneau-Russell from a single lower molar found at the Kirtlington Quarry of the Forest Marble Formation.

Etymology
The generic epithet Cherwellia comes from the River Cherwell, whereas the specific epithet leei honours the British artist A. J. Lee.

References

Morganucodonts
Prehistoric cynodont genera
Jurassic synapsids of Europe
Bathonian life
Jurassic England
Fossils of England
Fossil taxa described in 2016
Taxa named by Percy M. Butler
Taxa named by Denise Sigogneau‐Russell